Chistov is a surname. Notable people with the surname include:

 Kirill Chistov (1919–2007), Russian ethnographer
 Stanislav Chistov (born 1983), Russian ice hockey player
 , researcher

Russian-language surnames